Ayachi is a rural locality (a passing loop) in Rabochy Posyolok Erofey Pavlovich of Skovorodinsky District, Amur Oblast, Russia. The population was 32 as of 2018. There is 1 street.

Geography 
It is located 29 km from Yerofey Pavlovich.

References 

Rural localities in Skovorodinsky District